Cristo Martín Hernández (born 18 June 1987) is a Spanish professional footballer who plays for Racing Murcia FC as a midfielder.

Football career
Born in Santa Cruz de Tenerife, Canary Islands, Martín began his professional career at local CD Tenerife, making his senior debuts with the B-team in the 2006–07 season, in the fourth division. He made his first official appearance with the main squad on 30 August 2008, starting in a 3–2 home win against Gimnàstic de Tarragona in the Segunda División championship.

Martín spent the following three seasons competing in his native region, first with Universidad de Las Palmas CF in the third level then CD Marino. In the 2012 summer, he returned to Tenerife.

References

External links

1987 births
Living people
Footballers from Santa Cruz de Tenerife
Spanish footballers
Association football midfielders
Segunda División players
Segunda División B players
Tercera División players
CD Tenerife B players
CD Tenerife players
Universidad de Las Palmas CF footballers
CD Marino players
FC Cartagena footballers
Algeciras CF footballers
Lorca FC players
Racing Murcia FC players